Dori Arad (born 6 September 1982) is an Israeli former footballer.
He retired from play after the 2013 NCAA tournament.

Early life
Arad was born in kibbutz HaHotrim, Israel, to a Jewish family. His youngest brother is Israeli footballer Ofri Arad.

Honours
Big East
2007

References

External links
 Stats at ONE
 Article with Stats in Connecticut at Ynet
 

1982 births
Living people
Israeli footballers
Israeli Premier League players
Liga Leumit players
Maccabi Netanya F.C. players
Hapoel Nir Ramat HaSharon F.C. players
Israeli expatriates in the United States
People from HaHotrim
UConn Huskies men's soccer players
Association football midfielders
Israeli Jews
Jewish footballers